NTV is a Kenyan general entertainment channel. The channel began operating on April 4, 2005, and is a revamp from the previous Nation TV station under the Nation Media Group arm that has been in existence since 1999.

It is a popular TV Station in Kenya along with Citizen TV, Kenya Television Network, Kenya Broadcasting Corporation among other Kenyan broadcasting channels.

Youtube 

In September 2007, NTV went online with its content on YouTube. Within the first month it received over 325,000 views, three honors, and an average of 4,000 views for every video uploaded. In mid-2012, NTV went live on YouTube. Following this move, the blogosphere was awash with accolades with NTV's US correspondent (BMJ) Ben Mutua Jonathan Muriithi terming it a techno-revolution for mass media among Kenyans across the globe.

Programming 

Some of the programmes available are listed below.
Wicked Edition
Auntie Boss!
NTV Wild Talk
Churchill Show
Generation 3
Victoria's Lounge
AM Live
Real Househelps of Kawangware
Asintado
Tres veces Ana
Tamu tamu
The Trend
Teen Republik

References

External links

Television stations in Kenya
Nation Media Group
Television channels and stations established in 1999
1999 establishments in Kenya